{{DISPLAYTITLE:C5H10O}}
The molecular formula C5H10O may refer to:

 Isoprenol
 Isovaleraldehyde (3-methylbutanal)
 2-Methylbutanal
 Methyl isopropyl ketone
 2-Methyltetrahydrofuran
 3-Methyltetrahydrofuran
 Pentanal
 2-Pentanone
 3-Pentanone
 Pivaldehyde (2,2-dimethylpropanal)
 Prenol
 Tetrahydropyran